Suzanna "Suzanne" Melania Charlotta Maria Nijs or Suzanne Nicolas (1897 or 1902–1985) was a Dutch-Belgian sculptor.

Biography 
Nijs was born in Kortrijk, Belgium. Some sources state 6 April 1897 as her birth date and others state 4 November 1902. She studied at the Académie Royale des Beaux-Arts in Brussels. She was a student of Victor Rousseau.  Her work was included in the 1939 exhibition and sale Onze Kunst van Heden (Our Art of Today) at the Rijksmuseum in Amsterdam.

In 1924 Nijs was married to the stained glass artist Joep Nicolas (1897-1972), with whom she had two children. Their daughter,  became a stained glass artist. The family spent time in  France, Italy, Scotland, and the United States as well as Belgium and the Netherlands.

Nijs died on 1 April 1985 in Steyl.

References

External links
Mission cross by Suzanne Nijs at Roermond

Year of birth uncertain
1985 deaths
People from Kortrijk
Dutch sculptors
20th-century Dutch women artists